Korak (Balochi) is town and union council of Awaran District in the Balochistan province of Pakistan. It is located at 26°50'38N 65°44'3E and has an altitude of 648 metres (2129 feet),  During the floods of 2007 Korak was affected - 137 households (619 people) were impacted.

References

Populated places in Awaran District
Union councils of Balochistan, Pakistan